Indian Endeavour was a  cargo ship that was built in 1945 as Empire Dominica by Short Brothers Ltd, Sunderland, Co Durham, United Kingdom for the Ministry of War Transport (MoWT). She was sold to India in 1946 and renamed Indian Endeavour, serving until 1966 when she was scrapped.

Description
The ship was built in 1945 by Short Brothers Ltd, Sunderland, Co Durham. 

The ship was propelled by a triple expansion steam engine.

History
Empire Dominica was launched on 26 April 1945 and completed in August. She was placed under the management of R Chapman & Son Ltd, Newcastle upon Tyne. Her port of registry was Sunderland.  She was allocated the United Kingdom Official Number 180162, and the Code Letters GFDR.

Empire Dominica departed from Sunderland under tow on 9 June 1945, arriving at the Tyne that day. She made her maiden voyage on 30 August 1945, departing from the Tyne for Saint John, New Brunswick, Canada, where she arrived on 12 September. She departed on 22 September, arriving at Port Said, Egypt on 12 October and then sailing to Suez, from where she departed on 13 October for Karachi, India. Empire Dominica arrived at Karachi on 24 October, departing a week later for Lourenço Marques, Mozambique, where she arrived on 15 November. She departed on 26 November for Aden, arriving on 10 December. Departing eight days later, she arrived at Durban, South Africa on 31 December.

In 1946, Empire Dominica was sold to the India Steamship Co Ltd, Calcutta and was renamed Indian Endeavour. She served until 1966, arriving at Hong Kong for scrapping on 22 September 1966.

References

1945 ships
Ships built on the River Wear
Steamships of the United Kingdom
Empire ships
Ministry of War Transport ships
Merchant ships of the United Kingdom
Steamships of India
Merchant ships of India